Robert Peet Skinner (February 24, 1866 – July 1, 1960) was an American diplomat, editor, and publisher.

Biography
Skinner was born in Massillon, Ohio on February 24, 1866 to August T. Skinner and Cecelia van Rensselaer. At the age of 19, he became the editor and owner of a local paper called The Evening Independent. Through his work with the paper he would become acquainted with William McKinley, whom Skinner would support for the presidency. On June 17, 1897, he married Helen Wales. 

Through his wife's family and his own connections, Skinner would be awarded for his support for President McKinley with a wedding gift, a role in the McKinley administration. McKinley made him the United States Consul in Marseille from 1897 to 1901; starting up his career in foreign service. He would later become the United States Consul General in Marseille from 1901 to 1908; United States Consul General at the Consulate General of the United States, Hamburg from 1908 to 1914; United States Consul General at the Embassy of the United States, Berlin in 1914; United States Consul General at the Embassy of the United States, London from 1914 to 1924.

During his time in France, Skinner would become familiar with French colonial governance. He would become particularly interested with the prospect of establishing a trade deal for the United States with Abyssinia. In 1903 President Roosevelt would take interest in Skinner's proposal and order the diplomat to go to Africa. He arrived along with other representatives and a contingent of thirty U.S. marines in October of that year; they sailed into Djibouti from Naples before traveling to their destination via camel over a twenty-two day trek. Upon arriving they were escorted by 5,000 native troops to their audience with King Menelik. Ultimately the mission would be seen as a success, there would be increased trade between the two countries, due to a negotiated ten year commercial treaty. His mission would also see a growth of American fascination with their new African partner and provided a foothold into the continent for the still growing country. Upon returning to the United States, Skinner would publish an account of this mission in 1906.

He was the United States Ambassador to Greece from 1926 to 1932; United States Ambassador to Estonia from 1931 to 1933; United States Ambassador to Latvia from 1931 to 1933; United States Ambassador to Lithuania, 1931 to 1933; United States Ambassador to Turkey from 1933 to 1936. 

He died in Belfast, Maine on July 1, 1960. He was buried in Massillon City Cemetery in Massillon, Ohio.

References

External links

1866 births
1960 deaths
People from Massillon, Ohio
Journalists from Ohio
American male writers
Writers from Ohio
Ethiopia–United States relations
Ambassadors of the United States to Greece
Ambassadors of the United States to Turkey
Ambassadors of the United States to Estonia
Ambassadors of the United States to Latvia
Ambassadors of the United States to Lithuania
United States Foreign Service personnel
20th-century American diplomats